Jacek Nieżychowski (1924–2009) was a Polish actor.

1924 births
2009 deaths
Polish male actors